William Boothby (1829–1903) was an Electoral Commissioner for South Australia.

William Boothby may also refer to:

William "Cocktail" Boothby, American bartender and writer
Sir William Boothby, 1st Baronet (c. 1638–1707), of the Boothby baronets
Sir William Boothby, 3rd Baronet (1664–1731), of the Boothby baronets
Sir William Boothby, 4th Baronet (1721–1787), major-general, of the Boothby baronets
Sir William Boothby, 7th Baronet (1746–1824), of the Boothby baronets
Sir William Boothby, 8th Baronet (1782–1846), Receiver General of Customs at the Port of London, of the Boothby baronets

See also
Boothby (surname)